The 2000 Saskatchewan Roughriders finished in 4th place in the West Division with a 5–12–1 record and missed the playoffs for the third year in a row.

Offseason

CFL draft

Preseason

Regular season

Season standings

Season schedule

Roster

Awards and records

CFL All-Star Selections
Andrew Greene, Offensive Guard
Curtis Marsh, Wide Receiver
Demetrious Maxie, Defensive Tackle
George White, Linebacker

Western All-Star Selections
Andrew Greene, Offensive Guard
Curtis Marsh, Wide Receiver
Demetrious Maxie, Defensive Tackle
George White, Linebacker

Milestones

References

Saskatchewan Roughriders
Saskatchewan Roughriders seasons